Gmina Lyski is a rural gmina (administrative district) in Rybnik County, Silesian Voivodeship, in southern Poland.

The gmina contains part of the protected area called Rudy Landscape Park.

Neighbouring gminas
Gmina Lyski is bordered by the towns of Racibórz and Rybnik, and by the gminas of Gaszowice, Kornowac, Kuźnia Raciborska and Nędza.

Twin towns – sister cities

Gmina Lyski is twinned with:
 Darkovice, Czech Republic

Gallery

References

Lyski
Rybnik County